Aremu Afolayan   (born 2 August 1980) is a Nigerian film actor and the brother of Kunle Afolayan, a fellow actor.

Early life and career
Aremu Afolayan is of Igbomina-Yoruba descent, from Kwara State. He is one of the sons of the famous theatre and film director and producer Adeyemi Afolayan (Ade Love). He was known for his film titled  Idamu akoto (2009).

Personal life
Aremu Afolayan is married to Kafilat Olayinka Quadri. They have a daughter Iyunade Afolayan.

Awards and nominations

See also
List of Yoruba people

References

Nigerian male film actors
Living people
Yoruba male actors
Aremu
Male actors from Lagos
Male actors in Yoruba cinema
1980 births
Nigerian television actors